Corson County is a county in the U.S. state of South Dakota. As of the 2020 census, the population was 3,902. Its county seat is McIntosh. The county was named for Dighton Corson, a native of Maine, who came to the Black Hills in 1876, and in 1877 began practicing law at Deadwood.

The county is encompassed within the Standing Rock Indian Reservation, which extends into North Dakota. The Lakota people reside primarily in the South Dakota part of the reservation; the Yanktonai and Dakota live in that part in North Dakota. The Grand River, a tributary of the Missouri River, runs through the reservation.

Geography
Corson County lies on the north line of South Dakota. Its north boundary line abuts the south boundary line of the state of North Dakota. The Missouri River flows south-southeastward along its eastern boundary line. The county terrain consists of semi-arid rolling hills. A portion of the land is dedicated to agriculture. The Grand River flows eastward through the central part of the county to discharge into the river, and Standing Cloud Creek flows eastward through the county's lower SW area. The terrain generally slopes to the east and south; its highest point is near its NW corner, at 2,582' (787m) ASL.

It is the fifth-largest county in South Dakota by area. The entire county lies within the Standing Rock Indian Reservation, which also includes Sioux, Ziebach, and Dewey counties.

The eastern portion of South Dakota's counties (48 of 66) observe Central Time; the western counties (18 of 66) observe Mountain Time. Corson County is the easternmost of the SD counties to observe Mountain Time.

Major highways

  U.S. Highway 12
  South Dakota Highway 20
  South Dakota Highway 63
  South Dakota Highway 65
  South Dakota Highway 1806

Adjacent counties

 Sioux County, North Dakota – north (eastern half of county observes Central Time)
 Campbell County – east (observes Central Time)
 Walworth County – southeast (observes Central Time)
 Dewey County – south
 Ziebach County – southwest
 Perkins County – west
 Adams County, North Dakota – northwest

Protected areas
 Grand River National Grassland (partial)
 C.C. Lee State Game Production Area

Lakes

 Mallard
 McGee
 McIntosh
 Morristown East 
 Morristown West
 Lake Oahe (part)
 Pudwell
 Trail City

Rivers and Streams
Missouri River
Grand River
White Shirt Creek
Hump Creek
Stink Creek
Black Horse Butte Creek
Soldier Creek
Firesteel Creek
Oak Creek
Rock Creek
Cottonwood Creek
High Bank Creek

Peaks
Hump Butte
Black Horse Butte
Rattlesnake Butte
Elk Butte

Demographics

2000 census
As of the 2000 United States Census, there were 4,181 people, 1,271 households, and 949 families in the county. The population density was 1.7 people per square mile (0.7/km2). There were 1,536 housing units at an average density of 0.6 per square mile (0.2/km2). The racial makeup of the county was 60.80% Native American, 37.19% White, 0.10% Black or African American, 0.05% Asian, 0.22% from other races, and 1.65% from two or more races. 2.13% of the population were Hispanic or Latino of any race. 27.3% were of German ancestry.

There were 1,271 households, out of which 38.3% had children under the age of 18 living with them, 46.8% were married couples living together, 19.7% had a female householder with no husband present, and 25.3% were non-families. 22.1% of all households were made up of individuals, and 10.0% had someone living alone who was 65 years of age or older.  The average household size was 3.29 and the average family size was 3.82.

The county population contained 36.9% under the age of 18, 9.8% from 18 to 24, 24.3% from 25 to 44, 18.5% from 45 to 64, and 10.5% who were 65 years of age or older. The median age was 28 years. For every 100 females there were 102.0 males. For every 100 females age 18 and over, there were 100.8 males.

The median income for a household in the county was $20,654, and the median income for a family was $23,889. Males had a median income of $22,717 versus $19,609 for females. The per capita income for the county was $8,615. About 32.80% of families and 41.00% of the population were below the poverty line, including 48.60% of those under age 18 and 32.70% of those age 65 or over. The county's per-capita income makes it one of the poorest counties in the United States.

2010 census
As of the 2010 United States Census, there were 4,050 people, 1,260 households, and 939 families in the county. The racial makeup of the county was 67.0% American Indian, 29.7% white, 0.3% Asian, 0.1% black or African American, 0.3% from other races, and 2.6% from two or more races. Those of Hispanic or Latino origin made up 2.6% of the population. In terms of ancestry,

Of the 1,260 households, 45.6% had children under the age of 18 living with them, 40.6% were married couples living together, 21.9% had a female householder with no husband present, 25.5% were non-families, and 22.7% of all households were made up of individuals. The average household size was 3.21 and the average family size was 3.73. The median age was 29.7 years.

The median income for a household in the county was $30,877 and the median income for a family was $36,500. Males had a median income of $32,037 versus $23,167 for females. The per capita income for the county was $13,359. About 24.1% of families and 35.1% of the population were below the poverty line, including 46.7% of those under age 18 and 16.9% of those age 65 or over.

Communities

Cities
 McIntosh (county seat)
 McLaughlin

Town
 Morristown

Census-designated places
 Bullhead

 Kenel

 Little Eagle

 Wakpala

Unincorporated communities

 Athboy
 Black Horse
 Jeffrey
 Keldron
 Mahto
 Maple Leaf
 Miscol
 Snake Creek
 Thunder Hawk 
 Trail City 
 Walker 
 Watauga

Townships

Custer
Delaney
Lake
Mission
Pleasant Ridge
Prairie View
Ridgeland
Rolling Green
Sherman
Wakpala
Watauga

Unorganized territories

 Central Corson
 Lemmon No. 2
 Northeast Corson
 West Corson

Politics
In the 2020 presidential election, Corson County was the county with the highest percentage of Native Americans and the county or equivalent with the highest percentage of American Indians which Donald Trump won, after Joe Biden flipped Ziebach County.

See also
 National Register of Historic Places listings in Corson County, South Dakota

References

 
1909 establishments in South Dakota
Populated places established in 1909